Star is the eleventh sixth studio album (eleventh overall) by Japanese singer Mika Nakashima. It was released via Sony Music Japan on October 27, 2010, and was distributed in two formats: a CD-only standard version and a CD+DVD limited edition. Five singles were spawned from the record, including "Candy Girl", "Always" and "Ichiban Kirei na Watashi o".

Commercially, Star peaked at number three on the Oricon Albums Chart and had first week sales of 92,962 copies, a somewhat lower figure compared to her previous records. It went on to sell 155,457 copies within a month upon its release and was certified gold by the Recording Industry Association of Japan (RIAJ). Since then, the album has sold over 180,000 copies in Japan.

Singles
"Over Load" was released as the record's first single on May 13, 2009. "Over Load" was used in a Lipton Limone Commercial May 2009 where Mika starred as the model. Along with the B-side track "No Answer," the release exhibits a bright pop sound with oriental string-based instrumentations.

"Candy Girl" is a collaboration with Japanese women's fashion company Sly. Released on September 30, 2009, four editions of Candy Girl were made available with each having a different CD cover and design. Three of the versions are limited edition releases, with each containing a different T-shirt sporting the message: "Wake Up, Travelling Circus is Coming," in different colors. Musically, "Candy Girl" is a jazz-inflected soft pop song revolving around circus themes. Its B-side "Smiley" utilizes acoustic instrumentals with a jazz-tinged arrangement.

"Nagareboshi" is a pop-infused ballad with the track "Memory" as the B-side. The next single, "Always", is the theme to the film Sayonara Itsuka starring Miho Nakayama. The first press of "Always" came with a 2010 calendar, featuring photoshoots designed by Nakashima herself. The B-sides "Baby Baby Baby" and "Spiral" were featured in several commercials in Japan.

"Ichiban Kirei na Watashi o" ( "The Most Beautiful Me") is the record's fifth single and Nakashima's thirty-second overall. Released on August 25, 2010, it was the theme song for the TBS TV series, Unubore Deka ( Conceited Detective). Nakashima played the supporting role of Rie Hagurashi in the series. Musically, the is characterized for its "old-sounding" tune reminiscent of 20th-century Japanese pop songs.

Track listing

Charts and sales

Weekly charts

Year-end charts

Sales and certifications

Notes

References

2010 albums
Japanese-language albums
Mika Nakashima albums